Julia Wierscher (born 10 May 1971) is a German ice hockey player. She competed in the women's tournament at the 2002 Winter Olympics.

References

External links
 

1971 births
Living people
German women's ice hockey players
Olympic ice hockey players of Germany
Ice hockey players at the 2002 Winter Olympics
Sportspeople from Hanover